Mount Aberdeen may refer to:

Australia
a mountain in Mount Aberdeen National Park, Queensland, Australia
the former name of Mount Buffalo, in Mount Buffalo National Park, Victoria, Australia

Canada
Mount Aberdeen (Alberta), a mountain in the Canadian Rockies